Joseph Robert Binzer (born April 26, 1955) is an American prelate of the Roman Catholic Church who served as auxiliary bishop of the Archdiocese of Cincinnati, Ohio, from 2011 to 2020.

Binzer resigned as auxiliary bishop of Cincinnati in 2020 after a Vatican investigation concluded that he mishandled sexual abuse allegations against clergy.

Biography

Early life and education
Joseph Binzer was born on April 26, 1955, in Cincinnati, Ohio, one of seven children of Robert and Joan (née Metz) Binzer. He received his early education at St. Ann School in Groesbeck, Ohio, and graduated from La Salle High School in Cincinnati in 1973. He earned a Bachelor of Science degree in business with a major in accountancy from Miami University in 1977. He then worked for eleven years as a Certified Public Accountant with Crowe, Chizek & Co. in South Bend, Indiana, and with Arthur Young & Co. in Cincinnati.

In 1988, Binzer began his studies for the priesthood by entering Mount St. Mary's Seminary of the West in Cincinnati. He earned a Master of Divinity degree there in 1994.

Ordination and ministry
On June 4, 1994, Binzer was ordained a priest for the Archdiocese of Cincinnati by Archbishop Daniel Pilarczyk at the Cathedral of St. Peter in Chains in Cincinnati. His first assignment was as a parochial vicar at St. Dominic Parish in Delhi, Ohio, where he remained for three years. He then continued his studies at the Catholic University of America in Washington, D.C., where he obtained a Licentiate of Canon Law in 1999.

After returning to Cincinnati, Binzer served as a resident associate at St. Bartholomew Parish in Finneytown, Ohio and member of the archdiocesan Tribunal. He was master of ceremonies for Archbishop Pilarczyk from 2000 to 2003. In 2003, Binzer was named chancellor of the archdiocese, pastor of St. Louis Parish in Cincinnati, and director of the archdiocese's Department of Executive Services. In addition to these posts, Binzer became vicar general of the archdiocese in 2007.

Auxiliary Bishop of Cincinnati
On April 6, 2011, Binzer was appointed auxiliary bishop of the Archdiocese of Cincinnati and titular bishop of Subbar by Pope Benedict XVI. He received his episcopal consecration on June 9, 2011. Archbishop Dennis Schnurr, was the principal consecrator. The principal co-consecrators were Archbishop Pilarczyk; and Bishop Robert Conlon. The episcopal consecration was held at Cathedral of St. Peter in Chains.

Handling of allegations of boundary violations
In 2013, Binzer received allegations of improper behavior by Geoff Drew, a diocesan priest.  According to parishioners of St. Maximilian Kolbe Parish in Liberty Township, Ohio, Drew had been giving bear hugs, shoulder massages, and leg pats to teenage boys in his parish. Binzer notified the Butler County Prosecutor's Office of these allegations, but they chose not to prosecute Drew.  However, Binzer failed to notify Archbishop Dennis Schnurr about Drew and in 2018 Drew was transferred to another parish.

On July 30, 2019, Archbishop Schnurr put Drew on leave, saying that Drew had been sending inappropriate text messages to a teenage boy.  In a letter to parents, the principal of St. Ignatius School, where Drew was a teacher, said that the archdiocese had never notified him about past allegations against Drew or mentioned monitoring him. On August 5, 2019, the archdiocese reprimanded Binzer for failing to notify them about the 2013 Drew allegations and removed Binzer as head of priest personnel, though many parishoners felt like Binzer was being used as a scapegoat by the church. That same month, Binzer resigned from the Child and Youth Protection Committee for the United States Conference of Catholic Bishops. In December 2021, Drew went on trial for the unrelated rape of a teenage boy 30 years earlier.

Resignation
Binzer submitted his resignation as auxiliary bishop of Cincinnati to Pope Francis in late April 2020. On May 7, 2020, the pope accepted it. Binzer issued a public apology that said he had tendered his resignation after a Holy See investigation concluded  that his handling of Drew's case had "a negative impact on the trust and faith" of the people of the archdiocese.

A year after his resignation as auxiliary bishop, Binzer was assigned to pastoral duties at Corpus Christi Parish in Mt. Healthy, Ohio, and St. John Neumann Parish in Springfield Township, Ohio.

References

External links
Roman Catholic Archdiocese of Cincinnati

1955 births
Living people
Religious leaders from Cincinnati
Miami University alumni
Catholic University of America alumni
21st-century American Roman Catholic titular bishops
Roman Catholic Archdiocese of Cincinnati